The Bill for the Benefit of the Indigent Insane (also called the Land-Grant Bill For Indigent Insane Persons, formally the bill "Making a grant of public lands to the several States for the benefit of indigent insane persons") was proposed legislation that would have established asylums for the indigent insane, and also blind, deaf, and dumb, via federal land grants to the states.

The bill was the signature initiative of activist Dorothea Dix, and passed both houses of Congress in 1854. However, it was vetoed on May 3, 1854 by President Franklin Pierce, the first of his nine vetoes. Pierce argued that the federal government should not commit itself to social welfare, which he believed was properly the responsibility of the states.

The main provision of the bill was to set aside  of federal land:  for the benefit of the insane, and the remainder to be sold for the benefit of the "blind, deaf, and dumb", with proceeds distributed to the states to build and maintain asylums.

The initial request, on June 23, 1848, had been for five million acres (20,000 km²), which was subsequently expanded.

Context and legacy 
The bill was part of the first wave of public mental health initiatives in the United States, which saw the establishment of asylums.

The bill is seen as a landmark in social welfare legislation in the United States. Pierce's veto established a precedent for federal non-participation in social welfare that lasted over 70 years, until the emergency legislation and New Deal of the 1930s Great Depression. Compare instead the county institution of the poor farm.

No further federal legislation on mental health occurred for over 90 years until 1946 when the National Mental Health Act was passed, establishing federal mental health policy.

References

External links 
 Senate Debates On The Land-Grant Bill For Indigent Insane Persons, February 21, 1854
 Veto Message (May 3, 1854), by Franklin Pierce
 Speech of Hon. John M. Clayton, of Delaware, on the veto message, by John Middleton Clayton

Healthcare reform legislation in the United States
Mental health law in the United States
1854 in American law
United States proposed federal health legislation
Presidency of Franklin Pierce